The Patria 6×6 (Patria XA-300) is a six-wheeled armoured personnel carrier produced by the Finnish defence industry company Patria.

Patria 6×6 is primarily designed for troop transport but can be configured for other roles as well. The basic platform can be tailored to meet varying user requirements by many optional features e.g. swimming system, winch, upgraded armour protection and diverse weapon systems. Available weapons range from machine gun up to 25/30 mm medium calibre direct fire weapon systems and Patria Nemo 120 mm turreted mortar system.

The layout has driver and commander in front, engine compartment behind the driver and rear compartment for troop and role specific equipment. A passage in right side allows moving between front and rear compartments.

Patria 6×6 chassis is based on Patria AMVXP structures and components. The expected service life of the vehicle is more than 30 years.

History
Patria 6x6 was launched at Eurosatory 2018 exhibition in June 2018. A variant with Patria Nemo turreted mortar system was exhibited in DSEi 2019 and a Heavy Armoured Personnel Carrier variant with 25 mm remote weapon system in DSEi 2021.

Common Armoured Vehicle System CAVS Programme

In early 2020 Finland and Latvia agreed a joint development programme for Common Armoured Vehicle Systems (CAVS) based on Patria 6x6. The programme remains open for other nations to join it. As a result of CAVS Programme, Latvia announced an order for over 200 vehicles. It is planned that from 2023 Patria 6x6 for needs of Latvian army will be fully produced in Latvia, with partial production starting in 2022. First vehicles were delivered in October 2021. Finland followed with a letter of intent to procure 160 vehicles in 2023. The FDF signed an agreement with Patria to acquire three pre-series vehicles delivered by summer 2022 for test use before the final serial order. In 2022, Sweden, Estonia and Germany joined the CAVS Programme.

Operators 

 Member of the CAVS programme. Procured 200 vehicles (to be delivered between 2021 and 2029).

 Member of the CAVS Programme. 160 vehicles to be procured and delivered by 2023.

See also 
 Patria NEMO
 Patria AMV

Comparable systems
 TPz Fuchs
 Patria Pasi
 VBTP-MR Guarani

References

External links
 Patria 6x6 official website

Wheeled armoured fighting vehicles
Post–Cold War military vehicles of Finland
Six-wheeled vehicles
Military vehicles introduced in the 2000s
Armoured personnel carriers of Finland
Wheeled armoured personnel carriers
Wheeled amphibious armoured fighting vehicles
Amphibious armoured personnel carriers